The City of Salt or Ir-melah (עיר המלח in Hebrew) is a town referred to in the Hebrew Bible/Old Testament.  According to the Book of Joshua 15:62, the town was located in the wilderness of Judah, otherwise known as the Judaean Desert. It is identified by some scholars with the archaeological site of Khirbet Qumran.

Ancient name
The toponym is occasionally transcribed in English translations of the Hebrew Bible, such as Ir-melah in the JPS Tanakh, which is a transliteration of the Hebrew עיר המלח (ˁîr-hammelaḥ).

References

Book of Joshua
Hebrew Bible cities
Judaean Desert
Qumran